Muḥammad al-Awsaṭ ibn ʿAlī, was one of the sons of Ali. His mother, Umama bint Abi al-As, was the daughter of Zaynab, and grand-daughter of the Islamic prophet Muhammad and Khadija bint Khuwaylid. His mausoleum was established in Aran, Kashan, Isfahan province, Iran.

Biography
Hilal was born on 1 Ramadan, 14 AH (18 October 636 CE). Nothing is known about his life other than his role in the Battle of Karbala. He had a brother, Awn, who lived in Shaam or Ta'if (modern day Saudi Arabia). The governor of Khorasan, Qays ibn Murrah, feared an uprising against his rule, sent a strong army to fight followers of Hilal. In the ensuing battle, Hilal was injured, and his brother many of his followers killed. It is said that he wrote shortly before his death of a dream, in which his grandfather Muhammad, his father Ali, and his half-brother Al-Husayn, were waiting for him to join them. So he fasted the next day, breaking his fast with an apple. He reported his dream on the following day to his companions, Ya'qub and his son, and announced that he would be their guest in the evening, before dying in the night. Then after his death, Ya'qub and his sons gave him a ritual bath, and buried his body, where a shrine now stands, acting as a place of refuge for friends and followers of the Ahl al-Bayt (members of the Household (of Muhammad)).

References

Children of Ali
Children of Rashidun caliphs
7th-century Arabs